Elizabeth Egan Gillies (born July 26, 1993) is an American actress and singer. She gained prominence for her starring roles as Jade West in the Nickelodeon series Victorious (2010–2013), and as Fallon Carrington on The CW revival of Dynasty (2017–2022).

Gillies made her Broadway debut at age 15 in the musical 13, playing the character of Lucy. She made her first television appearance in The Black Donnellys (2007), later starring as Jade West in the Nickelodeon series Victorious (2010–2013). She provided the voice of Daphne in Nickelodeon's Winx Club (2011–2014), and she had a main role in the FX comedy series Sex & Drugs & Rock & Roll (2015–2016). Gillies starred as billionaire heiress and energy executive Fallon Carrington in The CW's series Dynasty (2017–2022), a reboot of the 1980s series of the same name. She has also appeared in various feature and television films, including the horror film Animal (2014), the television film Killing Daddy (2014), the comedy film Vacation (2015), and the black comedy thriller film Arizona (2018).

Gillies made her debut as a singer on Victorious with the song "Give It Up" in 2011, singing alongside Ariana Grande. She released other songs while on the show, including "You Don't Know Me" and "Take a Hint", singing alongside Victoria Justice, both songs being part of the Victorious soundtrack. During the Covid-19 pandemic she collaborated with Seth MacFarlane releasing an album entitled Songs from Home (2020) on Spotify.

Early life
Elizabeth Egan Gillies was born in Haworth, New Jersey, on July 26, 1993, to Dave and Lorrie Gillies. She has one younger brother, born 1996. Gillies has stated that she has Irish ancestry, and an Italian grandmother and great-grandmother. She left high school in her freshman year to pursue acting and participated in an online high school program.

Career

2005–2009: Early work 
Gillies' acting career began at age 12 when she started going to local open casting calls. She quickly began appearing in commercials for companies such as Virgin Mobile. Gillies' first television role was as a recurring character in three episodes of The Black Donnellys. She has stated that she was not allowed to watch the finished show in its entirety because her parents felt it was not appropriate for her at the time.

In 2008, she played small roles in The Clique, Harold, and Locker 514. That year she was also cast as Lucy in a Goodspeed production of Jason Robert Brown's new musical 13, alongside her future Victorious co-star, Ariana Grande. Later that year, 13 moved to Broadway, which made it the first Broadway production to have a cast and band entirely made up of teenagers. Gillies remained with the production until its closure on January 4, 2009.

2010–2014: Victorious and breakthrough
In 2010, Gillies was cast as bad girl and occasional antagonist Jade West in the Nickelodeon television show Victorious, a sitcom revolving around teenagers at a performing arts high school in Hollywood, which marked her second time working alongside 13 co-star Grande. Regarding her Victorious character, Gillies said "It's wonderful. I love playing Jade. I always say she's not so much the 'mean' girl, but the 'bad' girl in so many ways. She has a lot of human qualities to her – she's not just completely sociopathic. She's sweet with her boyfriend. It's nice to play a character with some depth." The show premiered on March 27, 2010. During her time on Victorious, Gillies was featured in several songs on the soundtracks Victorious and Victorious 2.0, including "Give It Up" (duet with Grande), and "Take a Hint" (duet with Victoria Justice). She also wrote and recorded the song "You Don't Know Me" for an episode of Victorious, and it was later featured in Victorious 3.0.

She lent her talents to other Nick shows, voicing the character of Daphne on the Nickelodeon revival of Winx Club and recording Winx Club's official song, "We Are Believix." She also appeared in an episode of Big Time Rush and as a contestant on BrainSurge and Figure It Out. Beginning in 2012, Gillies began playing small guest roles outside Nickelodeon. Notable appearances include White Collar and The Exes. In July 2012, it was reported that Gillies was working on an alternative rock album. Victorious ended on February 2, 2013, after four seasons. Following the cancellation of the series, Gillies took some time off from acting.

In 2013, she was cast as Courtney in the musical adaptation of Jawbreaker and participated in a reading of the show in Manhattan. The musical did not end up being taken to Broadway. On December 10, 2013, Gillies recorded a duet of "Santa Baby" with Grande for the latter's Christmas Kisses EP. In 2014, Gillies appeared in the horror film Animal as Mandy and the Lifetime movie Killing Daddy, playing Callie Ross. Animal was filmed in the summer of 2013 in Manchester, Connecticut, and was produced by Drew Barrymore. The film also features Gillies' former Winx Club co-star Keke Palmer and was released on iTunes June 17, 2014.

2015–present: Further acting
In 2015, Gillies was cast as Heather in the remake of Vacation. The film received a wide release on July 29, 2015. She was then cast in the comedy series Sex & Drugs & Rock & Roll as Gigi, an aspiring singer and daughter of a former rock star named Johnny Rock (portrayed by the show's creator, Denis Leary). The show premiered on July 16, 2015, to mixed reviews, but Gillies' performance as Gigi was well received. On September 9, 2016, FX declined to renew the show for a third season, effectively canceling the series.

In 2017, Gillies was cast as Fallon Carrington in The CW television series Dynasty, a reboot of the 1980s series of the same name. After Nicollette Sheridan left the role of Fallon's mother, Alexis Carrington, near the end of the second season, Gillies began playing the character temporarily, as well as continuing to portray Fallon. In 2018, Gillies starred in the dark-comedy thriller film Arizona as Kelsey. It was first premiered at the 2018 Sundance Film Festival, and later attained a theatrical release, as well as being released direct-to-video.

In 2019, Gillies, alongside Matt Bennett, made a surprise appearance during the November 19 show of her Victorious co-star Grande's Sweetener World Tour in Atlanta, in which Grande and Bennett performed "I Think You're Swell", while Grande and Gillies performed "Give It Up", both songs from Victorious. In 2020, during the COVID-19 pandemic, Gillies collaborated with Seth MacFarlane on a series of songs, eight in total, on a playlist entitled, Songs from Home on Spotify. In 2021, it was announced Gillies would voice the titular character in the upcoming superhero feature Catwoman: Hunted.

Personal life
On August 8, 2020, Gillies married American music producer Michael Corcoran at a private ceremony in Chesterfield Township, New Jersey. They reside in Atlanta, Georgia.

Filmography

Film

Television

Music videos

Theater

Discography

References

External links

 
 Elizabeth Gillies on YouTube
 
 

1993 births
21st-century American actresses
21st-century American singers
Actresses from New Jersey
American child actresses
American child singers
American film actresses
American musical theatre actresses
American people of Irish descent
American people of Italian descent
American pop rock singers
American television actresses
American voice actresses
Child pop musicians
Living people
People from Haworth, New Jersey
Singers from New Jersey
21st-century American women singers